The Liberty Towers or Liberty View Towers, is an apartment complex in Jersey City, New Jersey. It consists of Liberty Towers West, and Liberty Towers East, both of which were constructed from 2001 to 2003 and have 36 floors. The buildings rise from the same podium (base), which is used for parking and also contains a lobby. On top of the podium is a deck with leisure facilities for the tenants. The complex has 648 residential units. They were designed by architect Jordan Gruzen.

The S. A. Wald Company Building was demolished to make way for Liberty Towers, which were originally called "Liberty View Towers". The postmodern buildings are made out of masonry, glass, and concrete.

The building is part of a building boom in Jersey City's decayed railroad, warehouse and waterfront district, which is being redeveloped as large towers complex. It is in the middle of the reconstructed downtown and has access to trains.

Notable residents
 Evan Chandler

See also
 List of tallest buildings in Jersey City

References

External links

Residential skyscrapers in Jersey City, New Jersey
Residential buildings completed in 2003
Twin towers
Apartment buildings in Jersey City, New Jersey
Skyscrapers in Jersey City, New Jersey